Amman Civil Airport , commonly known as Marka International Airport, is an unscheduled airport located in Marka district, Greater Amman Municipality, Jordan, some  north-east of Amman city centre. 

After being the city's main airport from 1950 until 1983, there are no scheduled commercial passenger flights at the airport anymore. However, it still serves as Amman's main airport for general aviation, and moreover as an aviation education and training hub, and also sees freight operations. It serves as the home base for Arab Wings and Jordan International Air Cargo, additionally the Jordan Airports Company is headquartered here.

History
The airport was founded in 1950 by the British as a joint military civilian airport. It was the main airport for Jordan until Queen Alia International Airport was opened in 1983. 

In 2009, Jordan Airports Company officially assumed managerial and operational responsibility for Amman Civil Airport. The company is also entrusted with the development of 8,000 Dunums around Queen Alia International Airport. In coordination with international specialised consultants, the company has prepared a comprehensive master plan for Amman Civil Airport, which includes several capital projects. The company began the implementation of the first phase of the master plan to develop the facilities at Marka Airport. From 2012, several infrastructure and air side projects to modernise the airport had been implemented.

Accidents
 On 9 September 1956, a Jordan International Airlines Curtiss C-46A-45-CU Commando, registration JY-ABV, crashed into a downhill near the airport while trying to make an emergency landing following mechanical failures during climb out. The plane caught fire and all on board, but 1 passenger, survived the accident.

 On 22 January 1959, Air Jordan Flight 601, a Convair Convair CV-240-2 registration JY-ACB, crashed 2.8 mls Northwest of Wadi-es-Sir while approaching the airport in adverse weather conditions. All 5 crew members and 6 of the 11 passengers died in the accident making it the worst civilian plane crash on Jordanian soil. The cause was determined as the pilot's decision to fly below the minimum prescribed altitude to make visual contact with the ground in adverse weather conditions. 

 On 30 June 1973, Aeroflot Armenia Flight 512, a Tupolev 134A registration CCCP-65668, overshot the runway and hit a house during takeoff from the airport, killing 2 crew members and 7 people from the building, the other 5 crew members and 78 passengers survived. The cause was determined as the crew's decision to abort the take off at a speed of 265 km/h because the captain had the impression that the speed dropped due to the failure of one engine.

 On 23 September 1977, a Learjet 36A operated by Arab Wings, registration JY-AFC, impacted the ground in an inverted position on hard ground approximately 8 feet north of the parallel taxiway due to fuel imbalance during takeoff. All 4 on board were killed. 

 On 1 May 2006, a Royal Jordanian Air Academy Piper Pa-28-181 stalled and crashed while trying to make an emergency landing to runway 06 when the plane's engine lost power during initial climb. Both pilots and their passenger died as a result of the crash.

References

External links
Official website

1950 establishments in Jordan
Airports established in 1950
Airports in Jordan
Civil Airport